Lorenzo Abel Faravelli (born 29 March 1993) is an Argentine footballer who plays as a central midfielder for Ecuadorian club Independiente del Valle.

Club career

Newell's Old Boys
Born in Rosario, Santa Fe, Faravelli was a Newell's Old Boys youth graduate. He made his first team – and Primera División – debut on 28 February 2011, coming on as a late substitute for Lucas Bernardi in a 1–0 away loss against Tigre.

Faravelli was regularly used under manager Javier Torrente, but featured rarely after the manager left.

Loan to Unión Española
On 7 July 2013, Faravelli moved abroad after joining Chilean Primera División side Unión Española on a one-year loan deal. He scored his first senior goal on 9 November 2013, netting the winner in a 1–0 home success over Unión La Calera. 

Faravelli established himself as a starter before returning to Newell's in July 2014, but again featured rarely.

Gimnasia La Plata
In July 2015, Faravelli joined Gimnasia La Plata on loan for one year. On 11 August 2016, he signed a permanent three-year deal with the club.

Huracán
On 2 July 2019, Faravelli moved to Huracán. The following January, after failing to establish himself as a starter, he rescinded his contract.

Independiente del Valle
On 14 January 2020, Faravelli agreed to a three-year contract with Ecuadorian Serie A side Independiente del Valle.

Career statistics

Honours
Newell's Old Boys
Argentine Primera División: 2012–13 Torneo Final

Independiente del Valle
Ecuadorian Serie A: 2021
Copa Sudamericana: 2022

References

External links
 

1993 births
Living people
Footballers from Rosario, Santa Fe
Argentine footballers
Argentine expatriate footballers
Argentine people of Italian descent
Newell's Old Boys footballers
Unión Española footballers
Club de Gimnasia y Esgrima La Plata footballers
Club Atlético Huracán footballers
C.S.D. Independiente del Valle footballers
Chilean Primera División players
Argentine Primera División players
Ecuadorian Serie A players
Association football midfielders
Argentine expatriate sportspeople in Chile
Argentine expatriate sportspeople in Ecuador
Expatriate footballers in Chile
Expatriate footballers in Ecuador